Toe, stylized as toe, is a Japanese post-rock/math rock band from Tokyo. The group was founded in 2000, and consists of Kashikura Takashi (drums), Mino Takaaki (guitar), Yamane Satoshi (bass guitar), and Yamazaki Hirokazu (guitar).

Detailed information
Toe is currently one of four bands on the indie label Machu Picchu, which was formed by the members of Toe, along with the bands Mouse on the Keys, Enemies, and Tangled Hair.

The vast majority of the band's music is instrumental. The band has changed their sound over their musical tenure by incorporating acoustic guitars, Rhodes piano, and vibraphones in their most recent releases. The band tours regularly in Japan.

Their most recent studio EP, Our Latest Number, was released in 2018. 

In 2021 they contributed to the soundtrack for the anime series Sonny Boy.

Members 
 Yamazaki Hirokazu – guitar (2000-present)
 Yamane Satoshi – bass (2000-present)
 Mino Takaaki – guitar (2000-present)
 Kashikura Takashi – drums (2000-present)

Discography
Studio albums
The Book About My Idle Plot on a Vague Anxiety (2005)
For Long Tomorrow (2009)
Hear You (2015)

EPs
Songs, Ideas We Forgot (2003)
New Sentimentality (2006)
New Sentimentality "Tour Edition" (2008) Enhanced CDEP Limited to 1000
Toe/Collection of Colonies of Bees (2009)
The Future Is Now (2012)
Our Latest Number (2018)

Splits
Pele / toe (2002)

Remix albums
Re:designed (2003)

Compilation albums
That's Another Story (2018)

Live DVDs
RGBDVD (2005)
CUT_DVD (2010)
8 Days DVD (2012)
DOKU EN KAI (2021)

References

External links
Official website
Toe at Discogs

Musical groups established in 2000
Japanese post-rock groups
Japanese alternative rock groups
Math rock groups
Japanese indie rock groups
Musical quartets
Japanese instrumental musical groups
Japanese rock music groups
Topshelf Records artists